Peter de Witte (1617, Antwerp, to 1667, Antwerp), was a Flemish Baroque painter.

Biography
According to the Dutch biographer Arnold Houbraken, the painter whose name was spelled Peter de Wit was worthy of indexing in Houbraken's De groote schouburgh der Nederlantsche konstschilders en schilderessen (The Great Theatre of Dutch Painters) (1718), with a snippet of poetry about deWit by Cornelis de Bie that mentioned de Wit's talents as a landscape painter.

De Witte was the illegitimate son of Pieter de Witte II and the brother of Gaspar de Witte and Jan Baptist. After learning to paint landscapes from his father, he travelled to Italy,  and on his return he became a member of the Antwerp Guild of St. Luke in 1646. His pupil was Philips Bonnecroy. No works have been attributed to him specifically, though de Bie's poem mentions various birds, and a bird illustration decorates the page of the book with the poem on it.

References

External links
Peter de Witte Auction results on Artnet

1617 births
1667 deaths
Flemish Baroque painters
Flemish landscape painters
Painters from Antwerp